Carpați  was a Romanian brand of cigarettes, which was owned and manufactured by the "Fabrica de Țigarete din Sfântu-Gheorghe" ("Sfântu-Gheorghe Tobacco Factory"), which was a subsidiary of "Galaxy Tobacco". The brand is named after the Carpathian Mountains, a mountain range that stretches across Central Europe and Eastern Europe.

History
Carpați was launched in 1931 in the Kingdom of Romania, but production expanded significantly after the 1950s under the Communist regime, when this brand was produced in 6 factories (Timișoara, Sfântu Gheorghe, Târgu Jiu, Râmnicu Sărat, Iași and Bucharest). Each factory produced the cigarette with significant individual variations of the original recipe, giving birth to different preferences of Carpați smokers towards the producing factory. Throughout its production history, both filtered and unfiltered, king-size (85 mm) and short (70 mm) cigarettes were available under this brand, in either a soft or hard package, typically 20 cigarettes per pack. Furthermore, between 1950 and 1990, Carpați cigarettes were also available loose, typically sold by the dozen, in specialty tobacco stores. Only full strength cigarettes were ever produced, and the most popular model (and the only one produced until 2010) was the unfiltered, 70 mm variant in a soft, paper pack. Up until they discontinue of the brand in 2010, only a few thousands packs are produced each year, and mainly sold as a nostalgia item. It was one of the cheapest cigarettes available on the market, becoming a favorite amongst students, factory workers and in the military, at one point in the 1970s accounting for more than 60% of the total sales in Romania.

However, ever since the introduction of foreign brands after the Romanian Revolution and subsequent privatization of the factory, market share of Carpați cigarettes dropped to a mere 10%, and they were only sold on the internal market in Romania.

The production of this brand was discontinued in March 2010, and the Sfântu-Gheorghe Tobacco Factory closed its doors on 21 December 2010, after 113 years of cigarette production.

References

Cigarette brands
Products introduced in 1931
Discontinued products
Romanian brands